Ticket of No Return is a German drama film, directed by Ulrike Ottinger and released in 1979.

An exploration of the way women's public behavior is more heavily scrutinized than men's, the film stars Tabea Blumenschein as an unnamed woman who travels to Berlin with plans to do nothing but drink alcohol until she passes out, as a Greek chorus of commentators (Magdalena Montezuma as "Social Question", Orpha Termin as "Accurate Statistics" and Monika von Cube as "Common Sense") spout facts, questions and moral judgements about her actions. Over the course of the drinking spree, she also develops a quasi-romantic relationship with another unnamed woman (Lutze), and drinks in a variety of venues including a lesbian bar where a woman invites her to dance.

The film's cast also includes Kurt Raab, Volker Spengler, Günter Meisner, Eddie Constantine, Wolf Vostell, Martin Kippenberger and Nina Hagen in supporting roles.

In 2020, the film was selected for screening in the online We Are One: A Global Film Festival.

References

External links
 

1979 films
1979 drama films
1979 LGBT-related films
West German films
German drama films
German LGBT-related films
LGBT-related drama films
1970s German-language films
Films directed by Ulrike Ottinger
Films set in Berlin
Films about alcoholism
1970s German films